Elon James White (born October 16, 1978) is a media creator, journalist, and CEO of This Week in Blackness.

White was born in Brooklyn, New York. He is the founder and editor in chief of This Week in Blackness and the Black Comedy Experiment. White is the host of the radio show and web series "This Week In Blackness" which has been featured on Crooks and Liars, Daily Kos, and Jack and Jill Politics. White is also a contributor to the Huffington Post, Salon.com, The Root, and is a part of the comedy troupe Laughing Liberally, the comedic arm of Living Liberally.

White has appeared as a featured commentator on Melissa Harris-Perry's MSNBC show, the VH1 series Black to the Future and The Great Debate as well as Current's Viewpoint (talk show), Countdown With Keith Olbermann and The Joy Behar Show. White was the recipient of four 2009 Black Weblog Awards including Best Humor Blog, Best MicroBlog (Twitter), Best Video Blog and Blog of the Year. White was also listed by Tulane professor & author Melissa Harris-Perry as being one of the "Top 50 Politicos to Watch"

References

External links
Official Website
This Week in Blackness
The Black Comedy Experiment

1978 births
Living people
African-American male comedians
American male comedians
Comedians from New York (state)
21st-century American comedians
People from Brooklyn
21st-century African-American people
20th-century African-American people